Madam is a 1994 Indian Telugu-language comedy film written and directed by Singeetam Srinivasa Rao. It stars Rajendra Prasad and Soundarya, with music composed by Madhavapeddi Suresh. It was produced by M. Chitti Babu and G. Gnaram Harish under the Vijaya Chamundeswari Movies banner, presented by Rajendra Prasad. The film was released on 19 October 1994, and won two Nandi Awards.

Plot 
Prasad (Rajendra Prasad) a dubbing artist, his close friend Bobby (Subhalekha Sudhakar) loves a girl Kalpana (Latha Sri), keeping him by his side. But actually Kalpana falls for Prasad. Being incognizant of it, they move with the marriage proposal to Kalpana's brother Major Chandrakanth (Vijaya Rangaraju) a dictatorial personality and fixes the alliance. Just after, Bobby's grandmother Sarada Devi (Sowcar Janaki) is on her deathbed and wants to see the bride as a last wish. Immediately, Prasad rushes to Kalpana when he realises the truth, but maintains silence as scared of her brother. During that plight, Prasad reaches Sarada Devi in the woman disguise as Sarojini. But unexpectedly, Sarada Devi recovers and Prasad is stucks up therein. Later, Sarada Devi appoints Sarojini as a lecturer in her college where he loves a beautiful girl Soundarya (Soundarya). Now Prasad manages two characters and makes Soundarya accept his love. After some comic incidents, Sarojini turns as a social reformer and becomes very successful as Madam. Meanwhile, once escaping from Kalpana, Prasad again changes his attire as a modern woman Mandakini. Thereupon, an aged bachelor Rayudu (Nagesh) who is a photographer infatuated towards Mandakini. Currently, Prasad extends the 3rd attire too as Rayudu holds a photograph that shows his real form. Thereafter, to discard these problems Prasad & Bobby make a game plan and eliminates the Madam character. Unfortunately, Soundarya overhears their conversation, informs Sarada Devi when Prasad again appears as Madam and divulges the fact. At last, Sarada Devi decides to uphold secrecy because her ambitions & goals achieved by Prasad as Sarojini may be destroyed. Finally, they proclaim the world that Sarojini has died and the movie ends public giving tribute to Madam.

Cast 

Rajendra Prasad as Prasad / Madam Sarojini / Mandakini
Soundarya as Soundarya
Subhalekha Sudhakar as Bobby
Nagesh as Rayudu
A.V.S. as a journalist
Raavi Kondala Rao as Soundarya's father
Sakshi Ranga Rao
Vijaya Rangaraju as Major Chandrakanth
Vinod as Yedakula Venkatrao
Dr. Siva Prasad as Rayudu's P.A.
Gundu Sudarshan as Sarojini's bodyguard
Chitti Babu
K.K.Sarma
Kallu Chidambaram
Sowcar Janaki as Sarada Devi
Radha Kumari as Soundarya's mother
Latha Sri as Kalpana
Sailaja as Soundarya's sister
Athili Lakshmi
Kalpana Rai
Chiranjeevi as himself
Vijayashanti as herself

Soundtrack 
Music composed by Madhavapeddi Suresh.

Awards 
Nandi Awards – 1994
Best Home Viewing Feature Film – M. Chittibabu & Ramprasad
Special Jury Award – Rajendra Prasad

References

External links 
 

1990s Telugu-language films
1994 films
Cross-dressing in Indian films
Films directed by Singeetam Srinivasa Rao
Indian comedy films
Films scored by Madhavapeddi Suresh